The candidate information for the Thurston and Hessett Ward in Mid-Suffolk, Suffolk, England. This ward elects two councillors.

Councillors

2011 Results

2015 Results
The turnout of the election was 73.87%.

See also
Mid Suffolk local elections

References

External links
Mid Suffolk Council

Wards of Mid Suffolk District